Ståhlberg is a Swedish-language surname.

Geographical distribution
As of 2014, 56.6% of all known bearers of the surname Ståhlberg were residents of Sweden (frequency 1:12,608), 40.3% of Finland (1:9,886) and 1.7% of Estonia (1:57,464).

In Finland, the frequency of the surname was higher than national average (1:9,886) in the following regions:
 1. Ostrobothnia (1:3,160)
 2. Southwest Finland (1:4,846)
 3. Uusimaa (1:5,080)

In Sweden, the frequency of the surname was higher than national average (1:12,608) in the following counties:
 1. Gävleborg County (1:6,512)
 2. Örebro County (1:6,633)
 3. Uppsala County (1:7,604)
 4. Blekinge County (1:7,697)
 5. Dalarna County (1:8,480)
 6. Västmanland County (1:9,263)
 7. Östergötland County (1:9,945)
 8. Värmland County (1:10,275)
 9. Halland County (1:10,921)
 10. Stockholm County (1:11,871)

People
 Fredrik Ståhlberg (born 1966), Swedish Army officer
 Gideon Ståhlberg (1908–1967), Swedish chess grandmaster
 Johan Gabriel Ståhlberg (1832–1873), Finnish priest
 Karl Emil Ståhlberg (1862–1919), Finnish photographer and engineer
 Kaarlo Juho Ståhlberg (1865–1952), President of Finland, the son of Johan Gabriel Ståhlberg
 Reijo Ståhlberg (born 1952), Finnish shot putter

References

Swedish-language surnames